The Nimrod NRA/C2 was the only Group C racing car ever built by Nimrod Racing Automobiles in partnership with Aston Martin. It ran initially in 1982 in the World Endurance Championship before also joining the IMSA GT Championship. The final NRA/C2 would be retired in 1984 after the planned NRA/C3 replacement had been cancelled and the company went bankrupt.

Development
Beginning in 1981, Robin Hamilton hastily constructed a chassis for use as a test vehicle in preparation for competition in the 1982 season. This lone car, known as NRA/C1, was used to test design and mechanical features for the upcoming race car, the NRA/C2.

For an engine, Aston Martin turned to their tuning arm Tickford for the development of a racing version of their production V8 engines seen in the V8 and V8 Vantage models. This engine, becoming known as "Development Prototype 1229" (DP1229), retained the same basic displacement of 5340 cc while being strengthened in order to handle the increased output.

Eric Broadley of Lola Cars International designed the chassis of this new car, since he had experience already with the Aston Martin V8 engine fitted into the 1967 Lola T70. Since Lola constructed the basic tub, this earned it the designation "T385", although "NRA/C2" was the car's official name. The chassis was a simple, low design that featured a large air opening in the nose similar to an Aston Martin grill shape. Large side vents built into the doors would also be used.

Ray Mallock would later evolve the NRA/C2's design into a B-spec model for the 1983 season. These modifications included squared off front fenders, a thinner tail, and the removal of the vents in the doors. Small vertical exhaust vents would be added behind the front wheel well.

Racing history

1982
Debuting at the 1000 km of Silverstone, the two chassis were entered by Nimrod themselves, although only one actually raced. A third chassis that was also completed at the time had been sold to the owner of the Aston Martin Owners Club, John Dawnay, who ran the Viscount Downe Racing team as a privateer entry. Viscount Downe would be the more successful of the two, as they finished in sixth place at Silverstone, fourth in the Group C class. This was followed by the team taking seventh place at the 24 Hours of Le Mans, again fourth in class. The factory team would take an eleventh at Spa while Viscount Downe would take ninth at Brands Hatch. These successes for both Nimrod and Viscount Downe earned Nimrod and Aston Martin third place in the World Endurance Championship for Manufacturers.

1983
For 1983 Nimrod Racing would turn to the IMSA GT Championship in North America with two cars evolved into the B-spec bodywork, while EMKA Racing would take over Aston Martin's efforts in Europe with their own Group C car. Viscount Downe would remain in the World Endurance Championship with their lone entry as a privateer. Nimrod suffered throughout the season in North America, earning their only success as the 12 Hours of Sebring with a fifth-place finish, third in the GTP class. For the rest of the season the NRA/C2 would struggle to finish and Nimrod was forced to abandon the series towards the end of the year. One NRA/C2 was sold to Jack Miller's privateer team while Nimrod returned to Europe. Miller's Performance Motorsports finished off the season with an eighth-place finish at the Daytona Finale. Even with the troubles, Aston Martin took fifth in the GTP constructors championship.

Upon returning to Europe, Nimrod Racing Automobiles was forced to close its doors due to financial troubles, ending the short life of the project.

Privateer Viscount Downe had a similarly bad season in the World Endurance Championship, with a seventh-place result early in the season at Silverstone being their only race finish. Even with just one finish, Aston Martin-Nimrod once again took third in the Makes title.

1984
Viscount Downe would attempt to continue in the World Endurance Championship for 1984, even adding the last NRA/C2 chassis built before Nimrod folded. First appearing at the IMSA GT 24 Hours of Daytona, the team would manage seventh- and sixteenth-place finishes. However, upon returning to Europe, neither car would finish at Silverstone. For the 24 Hours of Le Mans, both Nimrods were eliminated in a single incident on the Mulsanne Straight, with John Sheldon hitting the barriers in the first car and Mark Olson in the second car colliding with the wreckage. A track marshal was killed in the incident. Both cars were burned beyond repair, forcing Viscount Downe to pull out of the championship and end the program.

Jack Miller's Performance Motorsports would also attempt to continue in IMSA GT before it too would be abandoned without a finish to its credit.

Chassis

In total five Nimrod chassis were built between 1981 and 1984.

Included are a list of finishes by each chassis.

 NRA/C1 001 - Completed 1981
 Development car
 NRA/C2 002 - Completed 1982
 1983 Daytona 3 Hours- 8th
 1985 Lime Rock 2 Hours- 16th
 1985 Mid-Ohio 3 Hours- 15th
 1985 Columbus 4 Hours- 15th
 NRA/C2 003 - Completed 1982
 1983 Miami GP- 20th
 1983 Sebring 12 Hours- 5th
 NRA/C2 004 - Completed 1982
 1982 B.R.D.C Silverstone- 6th
 1982 Le Mans 24 Hour- 7th
 1982 B.R.S.C Brands Hatch- 9th
 1983 B.R.D.C Silverstone- 7th
 1983 R.A.C Brands Hatch- 3rd
 1984 Daytona 24 Hours- 16th
 NRA/C2 005 - Completed 1984
 1984 Daytona 24 Hours- 7th

 NRA/C3 006 - Not completed

NRA/C3
A new chassis had also been under development in 1983, known as NRA/C3. Only a chassis tub and basic windtunnel testing had been completed before Nimrod Racing Automobiles was forced to close. This chassis, NRA/C3 006 is still in existence but has never been fully built.

See also
Aston Martin RHAM/1Aston Martin AMR1EMKA Aston Martin

External links

 Aston Martin Picture Gallery - Aston Martin Nimrod
 World Sports Racing Prototypes - Aston Martin chassis numbers

Aston Martin racing cars
Group C cars
IMSA GTP cars
Lola racing cars
24 Hours of Le Mans race cars